Dowlatabad (also Romanized as Dowlatābād) is a village in Akhtarabad Rural District, in the Central District of Malard County, Tehran Province, Iran. At the 2006 census, its population was 21, in 7 families.

References 

Populated places in Malard County